The 2015 Toronto Argonauts season was the 58th season for the team in the Canadian Football League and their 143rd season overall. The Argonauts finished with a 10–8 record, but lost the East-Semi Final to the Hamilton Tiger-Cats.

The Argonauts spent much of the 2015 season as a traveling team due to a litany of schedule conflicts between the 2015 Pan American Games and the 2015 Toronto Blue Jays season; in the latter case, the Argonauts' attempt to backload their schedule with home games backfired when the Blue Jays unexpectedly made the playoffs and advanced to the American League Championship Series, forcing last-minute relocations for the Argonauts as the Blue Jays held priority on use of the Rogers Centre. For the third consecutive season, the Argonauts' home pre-season game was played at the University of Toronto's Varsity Stadium.  The team played their regular season opener at SMS Equipment Stadium in Fort McMurray as the designated home team against the Edmonton Eskimos. This made the Argonauts the first CFL franchise to host regular season games in three different provinces (including New Brunswick for Touchdown Atlantic in 2010). In effect, the Argonauts played on the road for their first five games, with their home opener coming in week 7 against the Saskatchewan Roughriders, playing only 5 games in their host market during the regular season.   

The team later had to shift their October 6 home game against Ottawa to TD Place Stadium, home of the Redblacks, and their October 17 and 23 home games were moved to Tim Hortons Field in Hamilton.  If the Jays had advanced to the 2015 World Series, further Argonauts home games would have had to be relocated. The Argos did not fare well in the Hamilton "home" games; they lost both contests (knocking them out of contention to win the East division) and drew a combined attendance of 7,142.

The November 6 contest against Winnipeg (which drew 17,511) was their last game at Rogers Centre. Renovations to BMO Field were completed in time for the Argonauts to relocate to their new venue for the 2016 CFL season.

Offseason

CFL draft 
The 2015 CFL Draft took place on May 12, 2015. The Argonauts had seven selections in the seven-round draft. They traded their sixth-round pick for Dwight Anderson and received a seventh-round pick for Josh Portis.

Preseason 

 Games played with white uniforms.

Regular season

Standings

Schedule 
 Win
 Loss
 Tie

1 Originally scheduled for the Rogers Centre but relocated due to schedule conflicts.

 Games played with colour uniforms.
 Games played with white uniforms.
 Games played with alternate uniforms.

Post-season

Schedule

 Games played with white uniforms.

Team

Coaching staff

References 

Toronto Argonauts seasons
Toronto Argonauts season
Toronto Argonauts season